Philadelphus Bain "PB" Fraser (13 January 1862 – 30 October 1940) was a New Zealand Presbyterian minister, controversialist and editor. He was born in Lerwick, Shetland, Scotland on 13 January 1862. Out of four candidates, he came second to the incumbent, Thomas Young Duncan.

References

1862 births
1940 deaths
New Zealand writers
People from Lerwick
Scottish emigrants to New Zealand
Scottish writers
Unsuccessful candidates in the 1893 New Zealand general election
19th-century New Zealand politicians
New Zealand Presbyterian ministers